Thrills is the third solo studio album by German electronic musician Ellen Allien. It was released on BPitch Control on 16 May 2005.

Critical reception

At Metacritic, which assigns a weighted average score out of 100 to reviews from mainstream critics, the album received an average score of 72, based on 11 reviews, indicating "generally favorable reviews".

Track listing

Personnel
Credits adapted from liner notes.

 Ellen Allien – production
 Holger Zilske – production
 Steffi&Steffi – artwork
 Florian Kolmer – photography

Charts

References

External links
 

2005 albums
Ellen Allien albums
BPitch Control albums